Gowd Gach may refer to:
 Gowd Gach-e Olya
 Gowd Gach-e Sofla